Swan Pond Manor Historic District is a national historic district located near Martinsburg, Berkeley County, West Virginia, U.S.A. It encompasses 21 contributing buildings, one site, and one structure, over 2,465 acres. The agricultural district boundaries reflect the Swan Pond Manor land of Thomas Fairfax, 6th Lord Fairfax of Cameron, which he set aside in 1747 as a part of his Northern Neck Territory for his personal use.  Notable buildings include the Capt. James Mason House, Kroh-Sprinkle House (1819), Jacob A. Small House, Robert Carter Willis House, Dr. Williams House (a Greek Revival style house built c. 1840), "Hollidale," and "Wood Haven" (1895), Raleigh Morgan House.  Also located in the district is the separately listed Swan Pond.

It was listed on the National Register of Historic Places in 1980.

References

Historic districts in Martinsburg, West Virginia
Greek Revival houses in West Virginia
Houses in Berkeley County, West Virginia
Houses on the National Register of Historic Places in West Virginia
Historic districts on the National Register of Historic Places in West Virginia